The Remixes is a double-disc remixes compilation album by Australian singer Dannii Minogue. It was released by Mushroom Records on 3 November 1998 in Australia. It was released alongside The Singles and features remixes of singles from the albums Love and Kisses, Get into You and Girl. It also features the B-side "Hallucination" taken from the "Jump to the Beat" single. Remixes of "Love's on Every Corner" or the club commissioned "Heaven Can Wait" were not included.

Track listing
Disc one
"Love and Kisses" (12" Mix) – 5:54
"Success" (Junior's Big House Mix) – 6:05
"Jump to the Beat" (L.A Remix) – 6:44
"Baby Love" (Silky's 70's Mix) – 6:32
"I Don't Wanna Take This Pain" (12" Mix) – 6:02
"Show You the Way to Go" (12" Dub) – 7:22
"This Is It" (Dannii Got Murked Mix) – 6:14

Disc two
"This is the Way" (12" Mix) – 6:54
"Get into You" (Arizona Club Mix) – 6:00
"All I Wanna Do" (Trouser Enthusiasts Toys of Desperation Mix) – 11:06
"Everything I Wanted" (Xenomania 12" Version) – 7:08
"Disremembrance" (Trouser Enthusiasts Brittlestar Requiem Mix) – 12:17
"Hallucination" (L.A Remix) – 5:59

References 

Dannii Minogue compilation albums
1998 compilation albums